Canadian Falls may refer to:

Horseshoe Falls
Niagara Falls